Hauwa Maina was a Kannywood actress and producer who featured in the film Queen Amina of Zazzau. She died of an undisclosed illness at Kano hospital on the 2 May 2018.

Career 
She was the secretary-general of the local hausa association of female producers. Her first appearance was in Tuba, later on she featured on bayajida a historical film used in teaching pupil in school today. She owned her own production company known as Ma'inta Enterprises Limited which had produced films including Gwaska, Sarauniya Amina among others.

Filmography 
Tuba
Queen Amina of Zazzau
Bayajida
Sarauniya Amina
Gwaska and Maina

Nominations and awards 
 Best Afro Nollywood award in London, 2007.
 Best actress  at the SIM Awards, 2010.

See also 
Halimah Atete

Ali Artwork

Lucy Ameh

References 

20th-century births
2018 deaths
Kannywood actors
Nigerian film actresses
21st-century Nigerian actresses
Nigerian film producers
Nigerian women film producers
Actresses in Hausa cinema
Hausa people
20th-century Nigerian actresses